Events from the year 1989 in the British Virgin Islands.

Incumbents
Governor: Mark Herdman 
Chief Minister: H. Lavity Stoutt

September
 18 September 1989 - Hurricane Hugo strikes leaving widespread damage.  It is the first time hurricane force winds hit the Territory since 1932.

Footnotes

 
1980s in the British Virgin Islands
British Virgin Islands